NHL 09 is the 17th video game in the NHL series released by EA Sports in 2008. This was the final NHL game to be released on the PlayStation 2 and Microsoft Windows.

Online play
Players have the ability to create a player to use in online play featuring 6 versus 6 online teamplay mode. Users can join online teams with friends or find players to create one. Users have the ability to level up players, participate in tournaments (with brackets), and receive awards at the end of the season. Rosters have been updated, as well as slap shot power and accuracy to complement NHL updates

Reception

Critical response

The Xbox 360 and PlayStation 3 versions received "generally favorable reviews", while the PC version received "mixed" reviews, according to the review aggregation website Metacritic.

References

External links

2008 video games
Electronic Arts games
Xbox 360 games
PlayStation 3 games
NHL (video game series)
PlayStation 2 games
Windows games
Cancelled Nintendo DS games
Cancelled Wii games
EA Sports games
Video games set in 2008
Video games set in 2009
Multiplayer and single-player video games
Video games set in the United States
Video games set in Canada
Video games developed in Canada
Interactive Achievement Award winners
D.I.C.E. Award for Sports Game of the Year winners
HB Studios games